Gernot Gruber (born 17 November 1939) is an Austrian musicologist.

Life 
Born in Bruck an der Mur, Styria, Gruber studied music, musicology, philosophy and German literature at the University of Graz and received his doctorate in 1964. Afterwards he was assistant at the same university until 1970. From 1970 to 1972 he was a fellow of the Alexander von Humboldt Foundation. From 1972 to 1975 Gruber was an assistant at the University of Vienna and was habilitated for musicology in 1973. From 1976 to 1995 he was professor at the University of Music and Performing Arts Munich and from 1995 to 2008 he held a full professorship at the University of Vienna.

Publications 
 Mozarts Opern. Das Handbuch. Together with Dieter Borchmeyer, 2 volumes. Laaber-Verlag, Laaber 2007, .
 Schubert. Schubert? Leben und Musik., Kassel 2010, .

Further reading 
 Elisabeth Th. Hilscher-Fritz: Gruber, Gernot. In Oesterreichisches Musiklexikon. Online-edition, Vienna 2002 ff., ; Print edition: volume, Austrian Academy of Sciences publishing house, Vienna 2003, .

External links 
 
 
 Deutschlandfunk (DLF) Kulturfragen, 12. April 2009, 17:05–17:30 Uhr: Ewig unterschätzter Großkomponist der Wiener Klassik. Der Musikwissenschaftler Gernot Gruber über Joseph Haydn im Gespräch mit Holger Noltze

References 

Austrian musicologists
Mozart scholars
Academic staff of the University of Vienna
Academic staff of the University of Music and Performing Arts Munich
Members of the Austrian Academy of Sciences
1939 births
Living people
People from Styria